Ivana Dojkić (born 24 December 1997 in Rijeka, Croatia) is a Croatian female basketball player.

Professional career

WNBA
Dojkić signed a rookie contract with the Seattle Storm during the offseason prior to the 2023 WNBA season.

References

External links
Profile at eurobasket.com

1997 births
Living people
Basketball players from Rijeka
Croatian women's basketball players
Shooting guards
Croatian Women's Basketball League players
ŽKK Novi Zagreb players